Park Minjong (born 22 October 2001) is a South Korean junior tennis player.

Park has a career-high ATP singles ranking of 1,348, achieved on 17 September 2018.

On the junior tour Park has a career-high ranking of 93 achieved on 31 December 2018.

Park has represented South Korea at Davis Cup, where he has a win-loss record of 0-1. He played first match when he was 16 years and 104 days old, against Pakistan.

Davis Cup

Participations: (0–1)

   indicates the outcome of the Davis Cup match followed by the score, date, place of event, the zonal classification and its phase, and the court surface.

References

External links

2001 births
Living people
South Korean male tennis players
21st-century South Korean people